Youyun Township (Mandarin: 优云乡) is a township in Maqên County, Golog Tibetan Autonomous Prefecture, Qinghai, China. In 2010, Youyun Township had a total population of 2,865: 1,494 males and 1,371 females: 856 aged under 14, 1,847 aged between 15 and 65 and 162 aged over 65.

References 

Township-level divisions of Qinghai
Golog Tibetan Autonomous Prefecture